Acacia adenogonia is a shrub of the genus Acacia and the subgenus Plurinerves that is endemic to north western Australia.

Description
Like most species of Acacia it has phyllodes rather than true leaves. The evergreen, sessile to subsessile phyllodes can be patent to inclined with an inequilaterally ovate to lanceolate shape. It blooms from May to August and produces yellow flowers.

Taxonomy
It was first described as Racosperma adenogonium by Leslie Pedley in 1987 and then described by the Richard Sumner Cowan and Bruce Maslin as Acacia adenogonia in 1990 as part of the work Acacia Miscellany. Species related to A. deltoidea (Leguminosae: Mimosoideae: Section Plurinerves) from Western Australia as published in the journal ''Nuytsia.

Distribution
It is native to an area in the Kimberley region of Western Australia. The shrub has a scattered distribution with separate populations found through the West Kimberley particularly along the Bonaparte Archipelago, the Broome and Napiere Bay areas and inland as far as Phillips Range, Kimberley Downs Station and Beverley Springs Station where it is found on areas of sandstone growing in sandy soils as a part of open woodland communities.

See also
List of Acacia species

References

adenogonia
Acacias of Western Australia
Plants described in 1990
Taxa named by Bruce Maslin
Taxa named by Richard Sumner Cowan